Polyommatus aloisi is a butterfly in the family Lycaenidae. It was described by Zsolt Bálint in 1988. It is found in southern Mongolia. The appearance of the insect is brown with dots.

References

Butterflies described in 1988
Polyommatus
Butterflies of Asia